The Sangamon Valley Trail is an  rail trail on the west side of Sangamon County in the U.S. state of Illinois.  Skirting Springfield, Illinois, it extends from Centennial Park, on Springfield's southwest side, to Irwin Bridge Road near Sangamon County's northern border. It was constructed by a Sangamon County team in two stages; the 5.5-mile-long first or southern stage was completed in 2010–2011 at a cost of $3.8 million, and opened to the public on July 26, 2011. The 6-mile-long second or northern half of the trail was completed in 2016-2017 at a cost of $4.4 million, and opened to the public on November 16, 2017.  The trail is operated by the Springfield Park District.

Description

Right-of-way
The Sangamon Valley Trail's  right-of-way has been set aside for rail trail use.  It occupies an abandoned segment of the St. Louis, Peoria and North Western Railway, later consolidated into the Chicago and North Western Railroad. The primary metropolitan area served is the greater Springfield, Illinois metropolitan area.  The entire right-of-way connects Girard, Illinois, on the south end, to Athens, Illinois, at the north end. The right-of-way spans the western half of Sangamon County in a north-south direction, and also traverses small sections of Macoupin County and Menard County.  Population in the trail's service area in western Sangamon County is growing rapidly .

Trail expansion
A $4.4 million extension of the trail was constructed in work beginning in summer 2016.  The additional  of trail, which extends northward from the trail's former Stuart Park trailhead, connects Stuart Park with Fancy Creek Township near Cantrall, Illinois.  The extension of the trail to a northern trailhead at Irwin Bridge Road enables the recreational pathway to cross the Sangamon River, the river that provided the trail with its name.  Local leaders look forward to further lengthening of trail-accessible pavement on unused sections of the acquired right-of-way.   These extensions could lengthen the trail into portions of Macoupin County and Menard County.

References

Protected areas of Macoupin County, Illinois
Protected areas of Menard County, Illinois
Protected areas of Sangamon County, Illinois
Rail trails in Illinois
2011 establishments in Illinois
Protected areas established in 2011